The House of Nemanjić (Немањићи;  Nemanjić,  Nemanjići) was the most prominent dynasty of Serbia in the Middle Ages. This princely, royal and imperial house produced twelve Serbian monarchs, who ruled between 1166 and 1371.

Its progenitor was Stefan Nemanja, scion of a cadet branch of the Vukanović dynasty (1101–1166). After Nemanja, all monarchs used Stefan as a personal name, or a ruler's name, a tradition adopted for the royal pretensions. The monarchs began as Grand Princes, and with the crowning of Stefan Nemanjić in 1217, the realm was promoted to a Kingdom, and the Serbian Orthodox Church was established in 1219. In 1346, Stefan Dušan was crowned Emperor of the Serbs and Greeks, and the Archbishopric of Serbia was elevated to a Patriarchate.

The dynasty's rule in Serbia ended in 1371, with the death of childless Stefan Uroš V (r. 1355–1371). This led to the fall of the Serbian Empire. Provincial lords took control of their provinces. The last remaining members of the House of Nemanjić were John Uroš, ruler of Thessaly, titular emperor of the Serbians and Greeks, who died c. 1422-23, and his younger brother, Stefan Uroš, ruler of  Pharsalos. Nemanjić descent survived only through maternal lines in several Serbian houses.

Background

The Serbs, as Slavs in the vicinity of the Byzantine Empire, lived in so-called Sklavinia ("Slav lands"), territories initially out of Byzantine control and independent. In the 8th century, the Vlastimirović Dynasty established the Serbian Principality.

Christianity was adopted as state-religion in circa 870. In the mid-10th century the state had emerged into a tribal confederation that stretched to the shores of the Adriatic Sea by the Neretva, the Sava, the Morava, and Skadar.

The state disintegrated after the death of the last known Vlastimirid ruler – the Byzantines annexed the region and held it for a century, until 1040 when the Serbs under the Vojislavljević Dynasty revolted in Duklja (Pomorje). In 1090s, the Vukanović Dynasty established the Serbian Grand Principality, based in Rascia (Zagorje), but only in the 11th century Stari Ras became undisputably under Serbian control.

In 1166, Stefan Nemanja took the throne, marking the beginning of Serbia, henceforth under the rule of the Nemanjići (Vukanović branch).

Serbia under the Nemanjić dynasty

Serbia reached its height of power during the Nemanjić dynasty. The Serbian Kingdom was proclaimed in 1217, leading to the establishment of the Serbian Orthodox Church in 1219. In the same year Saint Sava published the first constitution in Serbia: St. Sava's Nomocanon.

Tsar Stefan Dušan proclaimed the Serbian Empire in 1346. During Dušan's rule, Serbia reached its territorial, political, and economical peak, proclaiming itself as the successor of the Byzantine Empire, and was the most powerful Balkan state of that time. Dušan enacted an extensive constitution, known as Dušan's Code, opened new trade routes, strengthened the state's economy, but its society's integration was unfinished and not unified enough until Ottoman invasion. Serbian medieval political identity has been profoundly shaped by the rule of this dynasty and its accomplishments, that were supported and cultivated by the Serbian Orthodox Church.

Stefan Dušan attempted to organize a Crusade with the Pope against the threatening Turks, but he died suddenly in December 1355. He was succeeded by his son Uroš, called the Weak, a term that might also apply to the state of the empire, which slowly slid into a feudal fragmentation. This was a period marked by the rise of a new threat: the Ottoman Turk sultanate, which spread from Asia to Europe conquering Byzantium and then the other states in the Balkans.

Members

Monarchs

The Nemanjić dynasty ruled the Serb lands between ca. 1166 up to 1371.

|}

Other members
 Đorđe Nemanjić (1208–1243), King (titular) of Zeta
 Stefan Vladislav II, King of Syrmia, (r. 1321–1325)

Family tree

In popular culture
 1875 historical three-tome novel "Car Dušan" by Dr Vladan Đorđević tells the story of Emperor Dušan.
 1987 historical novel "Stefan Dušan" by Slavomir Nastasijević is another story of Emperor Dušan.
 2002 historical novel "Dušan Silni" ("Dušan the Great") by Mile Kordić.
 2012 novel "Izvori - Roman o Nemanji i Svetom Savi" ("The Wellsprings - The story of Nemanja and Saint Sava") by Milan Miletić depicts Stefan Nemanja and his son, Saint Sava.
 2015 novel "Gora Preobraženja" by Ljiljana Habjanović Đurović tells the story of Saint Sava.
 2017 TV series "Nemanjići - rađanje kraljevine" (Nemanjić Dynasty: The Birth Of The Kingdom) portrays the rule of King Stefan the First-Crowned, the first King of Serbia.

Notes

See also 

 List of Serbian monarchs
 Vojislavljević dynasty
 Branković dynasty
 Lazarević dynasty

References

Sources

External links 
 Nemanjić dynasty dinastija-nemanjic.weebly.com 
 Serbian Medieval History www.blagofund.org

 
11th century in Europe
11th century in Serbia
Serbian royal families
Medieval Serbia